The 2017 Men's Asia-Oceania Floorball Cup was a continental floorball tournament held in Bangkok, Thailand from 1–6 July 2017. It was held at the Chanatrayingyong Gymnasium of the Chulalongkorn University. Eight national floorball teams participated in the tournament.

This tournament is the inaugural edition of the Asia-Oceania Floorball Cup (AOFC) organized by the Asia Oceania Floorball Confederation. It succeeds the Asia Pacific Floorball Championships.

Thailand became the first champions of the AOFC beating Singapore in the final. Both teams were undefeated before the final.

Preliminary round

Group A

Group B

Final round

Classification 5th–8th

Quarterfinals
Thailand and Singapore as the top teams in their group directly advances to the Semifinals.

Semifinals

Classification 5th–8th

Seventh place playoff

Fifth place playoff

Playoffs

Bronze medal match

Final

Final standing
The official IFF final ranking of the tournament:

References

Floorball Asia-Oceania Cup
Asia-Oceania Floorball Cup